Cylindrostoma is a genus of flatworms in the family Cylindrostomidae.

References

External links 
 
 Cylindrostoma at the World Register of Marine Species (WoRMS)

Turbellaria genera